Yannick Ferrera y Caro (born 24 September 1980) is a Belgian professional football manager and former player.

Club career
In his early twenties, Ferrera enjoyed a brief career as a professional footballer, playing for Belgian sides Beveren, Tubize, Ternat and Jette.

Managerial career
In 2004, Ferrera was appointed head coach of the Anderlecht youth team, which at that time included Romelu Lukaku and Adnan Januzaj. In 2010, he joined the technical staff of AA Gent, serving under manager Michel Preud'homme, whom Ferrera later followed to Saudi Arabian club Al-Shabab.

In 2012, Ferrera became manager of first league team Charleroi. One year later, he moved to Sint-Truiden that was playing in the Belgian Second Division. Under his leadership, STVV gained promotion to the highest level for the 2015–16 season.

In September 2015, Ferrera was appointed manager at Standard Liège. In spite of winning the domestic cup that season, he was sacked early into the 2016–17 season due to disputes with the board of directors. Ferrera was replaced by Aleksandar Janković. Janković's former club, Mechelen, immediately decided to hire Ferrera for two seasons as a replacement.

On 14 October 2019, Ferrera was appointed as the new manager of Saudi Professional League outfit Al-Fateh. He left the club by mutual consent on 9 January 2022.

On 21 October 2022, Ferrera was appointed manager of Cypriot First Division club Omonia Nicosia. He was sacked in February 2023 amidst disappointing results in the league.

Personal life
Ferrera was born in Ukkel to a Spanish father and an Italian mother. He remained his Spanish citizenship until 1992, when he was naturalised as a Belgian. His father, Francisco, and his uncles, Manu and Emilio Ferrera are all footballing coaches in Belgium.

Managerial statistics

Honours
Sint-Truiden
Belgian Second Division: 2014–15

Standard Liège
Belgian Cup: 2015–16

Individual
Saudi Professional League Manager of the Month: October 2020

References

Living people
1980 births
People from Uccle
Belgian footballers
Belgian football managers
Belgian expatriate football managers
Belgian people of Spanish descent
Belgian people of Italian descent
K.S.K. Beveren players
A.F.C. Tubize players
Belgian Pro League players
R. Charleroi S.C. managers
Standard Liège managers
K.V. Mechelen managers
Al-Fateh SC managers
 AC Omonia managers
Expatriate football managers in Saudi Arabia
Belgian expatriate sportspeople in Saudi Arabia
Association footballers not categorized by position
Saudi Professional League managers
Footballers from Brussels